4-HTMPIPO is a synthetic cannabinoid drug first identified in smoking products purchased from online vendors in 2012. 4-HTMPIPO is the product resulting from the electrophilic addition of water to the cyclopropane moiety of synthetic cannabinoid UR-144. Nothing is known about the in vitro or in vivo pharmacology of 4-HTMPIPO.

See also 
 AB-001
 JWH-018
 UR-144
 XLR-11

References 

Cannabinoids
Designer drugs
Indoles
Tertiary alcohols